Philaidae or Philaidai was a deme of ancient Attica, which appears to have been near Brauron, since it is said to have derived its name from Philaeus, the son of the Telamonian Ajax, who dwelt in Brauron. Philaïdae was the deme of Peisistratus.

References

Populated places in ancient Attica
Former populated places in Greece
Demoi